Elections to Ipswich Borough Council were held on 7 May 2015. Despite losing 4 seats to the Conservatives, the Labour Party remained the largest party on the council, albeit with a reduced majority. The Conservatives won 5 additional seats (4 from Labour and 1 from the Liberal Democrats) and polled more votes than Labour overall. The Liberal Democrats lost a seat and won no seats. UKIP and the Green Party won no seats.

Results Summary

Ward Results

Alexandra

Bixley

Bridge

Castle Hill

Gainsborough

Gipping

Holywells

Priory Heath

Rushmere

Spirtes

St. John's

St. Margaret's

Stoke Park

Westgate

Whitehouse

Whitton

References

Ipswich
Ipswich Borough Council election
Ipswich Borough Council elections
2010s in Suffolk